Brikama Forest Park is a forest park in the Gambia. Established on January 1, 1954, it covers 357 hectares.

It is located at an altitude of 18 meters.

References
  

Protected areas established in 1954
Forest parks of the Gambia